Virginia provided the following units to the Virginia Militia and the Provisional Army of the Confederate States (PACS) during the American Civil War. Despite the state's secession from the Union it would supply them with third most troops from a Southern state (next to Tennessee and North Carolina) along with the newly created West Virginia totaling at 22,000.  Also listed are the units of Virginian origin in the service of the Union Army.

Infantry units (PACS)

Infantry brigades
1st Virginia Brigade (Stonewall Brigade)
2nd Virginia Brigade
3rd Virginia Brigade
Wise Legion

Infantry regiments

Infantry battalions

Cavalry units (PACS)

Cavalry brigades
 1st (Stuart's) Virginia Cavalry Brigade
 2nd Virginia Cavalry Brigade
 3rd (Wickham's) Virginia Cavalry Brigade
 4th Virginia Cavalry Brigade (Laurel Brigade)

Cavalry regiments

Cavalry battalions, companies, and mounted rifle guards

Irregular units

Artillery units (PACS)

Artillery regiments
 1st Regiment, Virginia Artillery
 1st Regiment, Virginia Light Artillery (Pendleton's)
 2nd Regiment, Virginia Artillery
 5th Regiment, Virginia Artillery

Artillery battalions 
 1st Battalion (Hardaway's, Moseley's)
 4th Battalion, Virginia Heavy Artillery
 7th Battalion, Virginia Heavy Artillery
 10th Battalion, Virginia Heavy Artillery (Allen's)
 12th Battalion, Virginia Light Artillery
 13th Battalion, Virginia Light Artillery
 16th Battalion, Virginia Heavy Artillery
 18th Battalion, Virginia Light Artillery
 18th Battalion, Virginia Heavy Artillery
 19th Battalion, Virginia Heavy Artillery (Atkinson's)
 20th Battalion, Virginia Heavy Artillery
 38th Battalion, Virginia Light Artillery (Read's)

Light artillery batteries

Stafford Light Artillery

Heavy artillery batteries

 Bayley's Battery (Virginia Heavy Artillery)
 Bethel Artillery (Coffin's)
 Botetourt Artillery (Bowyer's)
 Campbell Battery (Patterson's)
 Coleman's Battery (Neblett's)
 Halifax Artillery (Wright's)
 Johnston Artillery (Epes')
 Kyle's Battery
 Lunenberg Artillery (Allen's)
 Marion Artillery (Wilkinson's)
 Pamunkey Artillery (A.J. Jones')

Horse artillery
 1st Stuart's Horse Artillery (Pelham's)
 2nd Stuart's Light Horse Artillery
 Callahan's Horse Artillery
 Chew's Battery
 Moorman's/Shoemaker's Battery
 Petersburg Artillery

Virginia State units

Virginia State Line

 1st Regiment, Virginia State Line
 2nd Regiment, Virginia State Line
 3rd Regiment, Virginia State Line
 4th Regiment, Virginia State Line
 5th Regiment, Virginia State Line

Virginia militia regiments

Virginia local defense battalions
 1st Battalion, Virginia Cavalry, Local Defense (Browne's)
 1st Battalion, Virginia Infantry, Local Defense (Ordnance Battalion)
 2nd Battalion, Virginia Infantry, Local Defense (Waller's/Quartermaster Battalion)
 3rd Battalion, Virginia Infantry, Local Defense (Departmental)
 4th Battalion, Virginia Infantry, Local Defense (Naval/Navy Department Battalion)
 5th Battalion, Virginia Infantry, Local Defense (Arsenal Battalion)
 6th Battalion, Virginia Infantry, Local Defense (Tredegar Battalion)
 7th Battalion, Virginia Infantry, Local Defense (1st Nitre Battalion)

Union Virginia units
 1st Regiment Loyal Eastern Virginia Volunteers
 1st Regiment, Virginia Infantry
 4th Virginia Infantry (later became 4th West Virginia Infantry)
 5th Virginia Infantry (later became 5th West Virginia Infantry)
 16th Regiment, Virginia Infantry
 167th Regiment of Virginia Militia (originally a Confederate unit.  Changed to Union after creation of the Restored Government of Virginia.  Later became the 167th Regiment of West Virginia Militia)
 Dameron's Independent Company, Virginia Volunteers
 Loudoun Rangers
1st West Virginia Volunteer Infantry Regiment (3 Month)
1st West Virginia Volunteer Infantry Regiment (3 Year)
1st West Virginia Veteran Volunteer Infantry Regiment
2nd West Virginia Volunteer Infantry Regiment
2nd West Virginia Veteran Volunteer Infantry Regiment
3rd West Virginia Volunteer Infantry Regiment
4th West Virginia Volunteer Infantry Regiment
5th West Virginia Volunteer Infantry Regiment
6th West Virginia Volunteer Infantry Regiment
7th West Virginia Volunteer Infantry Regiment
8th West Virginia Volunteer Infantry Regiment
9th West Virginia Volunteer Infantry Regiment
10th West Virginia Volunteer Infantry Regiment
11th West Virginia Volunteer Infantry Regiment
12th West Virginia Volunteer Infantry Regiment
13th West Virginia Volunteer Infantry Regiment
14th West Virginia Volunteer Infantry Regiment
15th West Virginia Volunteer Infantry Regiment
16th West Virginia Volunteer Infantry Regiment
17th West Virginia Volunteer Infantry Regiment
Independent Battalion West Virginia Infantry
1st Independent Company Loyal Virginians
1st West Virginia Volunteer Cavalry Regiment
2nd West Virginia Volunteer Cavalry Regiment
3rd West Virginia Volunteer Cavalry Regiment
4th West Virginia Volunteer Cavalry Regiment
5th West Virginia Volunteer Cavalry Regiment
6th West Virginia Volunteer Cavalry Regiment
7th West Virginia Volunteer Cavalry Regiment
Battery "A" West Virginia Light Artillery
Battery "B" West Virginia Light Artillery
Battery "C" West Virginia Light Artillery
Battery "D" West Virginia Light Artillery
Battery "E" West Virginia Light Artillery
Battery "F" West Virginia Light Artillery
Battery "G" West Virginia Light Artillery
Battery "H" West Virginia Light Artillery

See also
Virginia in the Civil War
List of American Civil War regiments by state
Southern Unionists
United States Colored Troops

References

 Armstrong, Richard L., Eleventh Virginia Infantry (The Virginia regimental histories series). H. E. Howard, 1st edition, 1989. 
 Alderman, John P., Twenty Ninth Virginia Infantry (The Virginia regimental histories series). H. E. Howard, 1st edition, 1989. 
 Ashcraft, John M., Thirty First Virginia Infantry (The Virginia regimental histories series). H. E. Howard, 1st edition, 1988. 
 Cavanaug, Michael A., Sixth Virginia Infantry (The Virginia regimental histories series). H. E. Howard, 1st edition, 1988. 
 Chapla, John D., Forty Eighth Virginia Infantry (The Virginia regimental histories series). H. E. Howard, 1st edition, 1989. 
 Davis, James A., 51st Virginia Infantry (The Virginia regimental histories series). H. E. Howard, 2nd edition, 1984. 
 Delauter, Roger U., McNeill's Rangers (The Virginia regimental histories series). H. E. Howard, 1st edition, 1986. 
 Dickinson, Jack L., Eighth Virginia Infantry (The Virginia regimental histories series). H. E. Howard, 2nd edition, 1986. 
 Driver, Robert J., The First and Second Rockbridge Artillery (The Virginia regimental histories series). H. E. Howard, 2nd edition, 1987. 
 Hearn, Chet, The Civil War: Virginia. Salamander Books, Ltd., 2005. 
 Murphy, Terrence, Tenth Virginia Infantry (The Virginia regimental histories series). H. E. Howard, 1st edition, 1989. 
 O'Sullivan, Richard, Fifty Fifth Virginia Infantry (The Virginia regimental histories series). H. E. Howard, 1st edition, 1989. 
 Rankin, Thomas M., 37th Virginia Infantry (The Virginia regimental histories series). H. E. Howard, 1st edition, 1987. 
 Riggs, David F. Thirteenth Virginia Infantry (The Virginia regimental histories series). H. E. Howard, 1st edition, 1988. 
 Riggs, Susan A., Twenty First Virginia Infantry (The Virginia regimental histories series). H. E. Howard, 1st edition, 1991. 
 Ruffner, Kevin Conley, Forty Fourth Virginia Infantry (The Virginia regimental histories series). H. E. Howard, 1st edition, 1987. 
 Scott, J. L., Forty Fifth Virginia Infantry (The Virginia regimental histories series). H. E. Howard, 1st edition, 1989. 
 Sherwood, W. Cullen, The Nelson Artillery - Lamkin and Rives batteries (The Virginia regimental histories series). H. E. Howard, 1st edition, 1991. 
 Sublett, Charles W., 57th Virginia Infantry (The Virginia regimental histories series). H. E. Howard, 1st edition, 1986. 
 Trask, Benjamin H., 9th Virginia Infantry (The Virginia regimental histories series). H. E. Howard, 1st edition, 1984. 
 Trask, Benjamin H., Sixty First Virginia Infantry (The Virginia regimental histories series). H. E. Howard, 1st edition, 1988. 
 Wallace, Lee A, Jr., Fifth Virginia Infantry (The Virginia regimental histories series). H. E. Howard, 1st edition, 1988. 
 Wallace, Lee, The Richmond Howitzers (The Virginia regimental histories series). H. E. Howard, 1st edition, 1994. 
 Wallace, Lee A, Jr., Seventeenth Virginia Infantry (The Virginia regimental histories series). H. E. Howard, 1st edition, 1990. 
 Weaver, Jeffrey C., The Nottoway Artillery & Barr's Battery Virginia Light Artillery (The Virginia regimental histories series). H. E. Howard, 1st edition, 1994. 
 Weaver, Patti O., Reserves (The Virginia regimental histories series). H. E. Howard, 1st edition, 2002. 
 West, P. Michael, 30th Battalion Virginia Sharpshooters (The Virginia regimental histories series). H. E. Howard, 1st edition, 1995. 

Virginia in the American Civil War
 
Virginia